Giacomo Morandi (born 24 August 1965) is an Italian prelate of the Catholic Church who has been named bishop of Reggio Emilia-Guastalla. He served as the undersecretary of the Congregation for the Doctrine of the Faith from 2015 to 2017 and then as secretary until 2022. He was made an archbishop in 2017 and retains that as his personal title.

Life
Giacomo Morandi was born in Modena on 24 August 1965.

In 1978 he commenced his studies for the priesthood in Modena and received his ordination on 11 April 1990 from Archbishop Santo Bartolomeo Quadri. He obtained his baccalaureate in theological studies and in 1992 obtained a licentiate in Biblical Sciences at the Pontifical Biblical Institute in Rome. In 2008 he obtained a licentiate and a doctorate in theological evangelization at the Pontifical Gregorian as well as in missiology. Morandi also served as a professor at the Institute of Religious Sciences in Modena and as a lecturer on patristic exegesis at an institute in Rome.

Morandi held various pastoral positions in the Modena archdiocese and he served as the vicar for episcopal catechesis and both evangelization and culture from 2005 until 2010 before his appointment in November 2010 as the vicar general for the archdiocese. This assignment ceased in 2015 upon the death of the archbishop at which stage he served as the diocesan administrator from 20 February to 12 September 2015 until the selection of a new archbishop. On 14 September the new archbishop Erio Castellucci reappointed him as the archdiocese's vicar general.

On 27 October 2015, Pope Francis appointed him undersecretary of the Congregation for the Doctrine of the Faith. On 18 July 2017, he appointed him secretary of that body and elevated him to the rank of archbishop with the titular see of Cerveteri. Morandi received his episcopal consecration in the Modena Cathedral on 30 September 2017 from Archbishop Angelo De Donatis, along with co-consecrators Archbishop Erio Castellucci and Bishop Luciano Monari. He was reportedly responsible for the Congregation's March 2021 document that explained why the church forbids the blessing of same-sex unions, which was largely respectful of those in such relationships but proved controversial for its assertion that the church "cannot bless sin".

On 10 January 2022, Pope Francis named him as the bishop of Reggio Emilia-Guastalla, granting him the use of the personal title of archbishop. His installation there was scheduled for 13 March.

Published works
 Lugo teologico di evangelizzazione, Milano, Edizioni Paoline, 2009, .

References

External links
  
 

1965 births
21st-century Italian Roman Catholic titular archbishops
Living people
Members of the Congregation for the Doctrine of the Faith
Religious leaders from Modena
Pontifical Biblical Institute alumni
Pontifical Gregorian University alumni